Durham is a census-designated place (CDP) comprising the primary village and surrounding development in the town of Durham, Middlesex County, Connecticut, United States. It is in the central and northeastern portions of the town, bordered to the north by the town of Middlefield and the city of Middletown. As of the 2020 census, the CDP had a population of 3,771, out of 7,152 in the entire town of Durham.

The Main Street Historic District occupies  at the center of the community.

References 

Census-designated places in Middlesex County, Connecticut
Census-designated places in Connecticut